Universal File Format is a file format originally developed by the Structural Dynamics Research Corporation (SDRC) to standardize data transfer between computer aided design (CAD) and computer aided test (CAT) software packages.

References

 An overview of UF Formats from SDRL website.
 A tutorial from NI website.

Computer file formats
Computer-aided design software